Maxwell Henry Wolf Burkholder (born November 1, 1997) is an American actor most notable for his role as Max Braverman in the comedic television drama on NBC, Parenthood. Prior to that, he became known as a voice actor for his roles as Chomper in The Land Before Time, Roo on My Friends Tigger & Pooh and World in the television movie of Foster's Home for Imaginary Friends, Destination: Imagination. In 2013, Burkholder appeared in the film The Purge. He is currently a member of the comedy account on Instagram, Max 'n' the Jakey Boys.

Life and career
Burkholder’s parents are former actors. He attended Campbell Hall School. Burkholder was accepted into Harvard University as a member of the Class of 2021. There he began his theatrical career appearing in the premier production of columbinus at Harvard portraying Dylan Klebold/Loner. Burkholder is Jewish.

Television
Burkholder has appeared on Parenthood as Max Braverman and as young Mitch on Crumbs. He guest starred on an episode of CSI: Miami, “Death Pool 100” and in an episode of CSI: NY. In addition, he played Billy in one episode of The Suite Life of Zack & Cody on Disney Channel and was the voice of Samsquatch in Random! Cartoons. He also appeared in the television series In Treatment and Love for Rent and played the role of Duncan in the episode of Grey's Anatomy, “Brave New World”. He also played a child at an airport in an episode of The O.C.. 

Burkholder has lent his voice for several shows. He voiced Chomper in the television series The Land Before Time, based on film series of the same name. He also provided the voice of Roo on My Friends Tigger & Pooh (taking over the role from Jimmy Bennett) and played “World” the imaginary friend inside a toybox in the movie of Foster's Home for Imaginary Friends, Destination: Imagination (2008).

For Burkholder’s role as Max Braverman on Parenthood, executive producer Jason Katims said consultant Wayne Tashjian, a behavioral psychologist, looked at the script and met with Burkholder and his mother about those scenes involving the character of Max. Burkholder and his mother then practised the scenes by themselves. For special scenes, the show employed a second consultant to ensure accuracy.

Film
Burkholder initially played Max in Daddy Day Care (2003) and also appeared in Friends with Money (2006). He played the son of James Sandin in the horror film The Purge in the summer of 2013.

Filmography

Awards and nominations

References

External links

1997 births
Living people
21st-century American male actors
Male actors from Los Angeles
American male child actors
American male film actors
American male television actors
American male voice actors